If You Only Knew may refer to:

 "If You Only Knew" (Shinedown song), 2008
 "If You Only Knew" (Savannah Outen Song), 2009
 If You Only Knew (album), a 1999 album by Gina Thompson
 If You Only Knew, a 1956 album by Jimmy Scott
 If You Only Knew, a song on the 1987 album Piledriver: The Wrestling Album II

See also
 "If Only You Knew", a song on Patti LaBelle's 1983 album I'm in Love Again